The Georgia Appalachian Trail Club, Inc. (GATC) is a non-profit organization that was organized in 1930 in Dahlonega, GA.  Its membership consists of individual volunteers who share a love for the Appalachian Trail (AT).

The GATC is responsible for the management and maintenance of the AT in Georgia.  This is accomplished through cooperation with the Appalachian Trail Conservancy (ATC) and the U.S. Forest Service (USFS). 

The GATC is active in the conservation community on issues relating to the protection of the Appalachian Trail.  It also conducts a wide range of outdoor recreational events for its membership.

See also
Georgia Peaks on the Appalachian Trail

External links
Georgia Appalachian Trail Club
Appalachian Trail Conservancy
U.S. Forest Service

Hiking organizations in the United States
Organizations established in 1930
Appalachian Trail